Evander Holyfield vs. Alex Stewart II, billed as "Only the Strong Survive" was a professional boxing match contested on June 26, 1993.

Background
In his previous fight on November 13, 1992, Evander Holyfield had suffered his first professional loss to Riddick Bowe, ending his 2-year reign as undisputed heavyweight champion. Following the loss, Holyfield parted ways with long-time trainers Lou Duva and George Benton and replaced them with Emanuel Steward. Holyfield claimed he made the switch to help "rekindle his enthusiasm for boxing." Steward also made the decision to reduce Holyfield's sparring sessions in an effort to keep Holyfield fresh, stating "He's got to start a whole new career if he's going to continue boxing". In the months after the loss, Holyfield mulled a comeback, but in April 1993, he would reach an agreement with Bowe for a rematch later in the year. As part of the contract, both fighters agreed to have one fight before the rematch. Bowe announced that he would defend his heavyweight championship against Jesse Ferguson in May, while Holyfield decided to meet Alex Stewart in a rematch of their 1989 fight in June.

The fight
In contrast to their thrilling 1989 fight, Holyfield controlled almost the entire fight as Stewart offered little offense. A right uppercut landed by Holyfield towards the end of the first round opened a cut beside Stewart's left eye, though it was not as severe as the cut he suffered in the 1989 fight. The fight would go the full 12 rounds with Holyfield winning lopsidedly on all three of the judge's scorecards with 2 scores of 118–110 and one score of 119–109.

Emmanuel Steward blamed the lackluster fight on Stewart, stating "He acted like he didn't want to fight. I was looking for this great war, I was nervous. Then he comes out and looks like he wants to go to bed." Stewart was also critical of his own performance. "Of course this wasn't one of my better performances, I couldn't throw punches, I couldn't get off. I thought I could fight a defensive fight until about the sixth round and then try to go for the kill, but I couldn't get any combinations or anything at all. I have to apologize to everyone because I did not fight a very good fight."

Fight card

References

1993 in boxing
Stewart II
June 1993 sports events in the United States
Boxing matches at Boardwalk Hall